Pauline Therese Toner (16 March 1935 – 3 March 1989) was the first female cabinet minister in the Parliament of Victoria. A member of the Labor Party, she was elected to the Victorian Legislative Assembly in 1977 and was Minister for Community Welfare Services from 1982 to 1985.  She resigned from Parliament in 1989 and died on 3 March 1989.

Biography 
Toner was born in Horsham, Victoria, the third child of William and Madge Hoare.  After attending the Brigidine Convent in Horsham, she trained as a primary school teacher, then attended university, obtaining a Bachelor of Arts (University of Melbourne) and a Bachelor of Education (La Trobe University). In 1962 she married architect Brian Toner (d. 2008) and they had five children: Jane, Madeline, Rachel, Lucy and Denis. Illness forced her resignation from parliament on 28 February 1989, and she died of cancer three days later on 3 March.

Career 
Following her early teaching career, Toner became a lecturer at the State College of Victoria.  She joined the Labor Party (ALP) in 1968 and was elected to the Diamond Valley Shire Council in 1973, becoming shire president in 1977.

She was elected to the Victorian Legislative Assembly in a by-election in 1977, winning the seat of Greensborough for the ALP, and became the opposition spokeswoman on community services and women's affairs.  When the ALP formed government in 1982, Toner became the Minister for Community Welfare Services, and the first woman to hold a ministerial position in the Victorian Parliament.  She held that office until 1985, and continued to serve as a backbencher until her resignation in 1989.

Toner's work focussed on the rights of children, and her legacy includes the introduction of laws that made it easier for adoptees to obtain information about their adoption.  She also implemented funding for Neighbourhood Houses.

In 1986 the Eltham Copper Butterfly (Paralucia pyrodiscus lucida), thought to be extinct, was rediscovered in the Greensborough electorate. Toner campaigned successfully to acquire land for the protection of this threatened species.

References

1935 births
1989 deaths
Australian Labor Party members of the Parliament of Victoria
Members of the Victorian Legislative Assembly
Women mayors of places in Victoria (Australia)
University of Melbourne alumni
La Trobe University alumni
Australian schoolteachers
Deaths from cancer in Victoria (Australia)
20th-century Australian politicians
People from Horsham, Victoria
20th-century Australian women politicians
Women members of the Victorian Legislative Assembly
Mayors of places in Victoria (Australia)